Lasiopetalum laxiflorum is a species of flowering plant in the family Malvaceae and is endemic to the south-west of Western Australia. It is a sticky, straggling subshrub or shrub with many densely hairy stems, egg-shaped leaves, and bright pink and dark red flowers.

Description
The back of the sepals is sticky with dark red glandular hairs. Flowering has been recorded from October to January.

Taxonomy
This species was first formally described in 1863 by George Bentham who gave it the name Thomasia laxiflora in Flora Australiensis from specimens collected by James Drummond in the Swan River Colony. In 1881, Ferdinand von Mueller changed the name to Lasiopetalum laxiflorum in Fragmenta Phytographiae Australiae. The specific epithet (laxiflorum) means "loose- or open-flowered".

Distribution and habitat
Lasiopetalum laxiflorum grows in woodland and forest in or near the Whicher Range in the Jarrah Forest and Swan Coastal Plain biogeographic regions of south-western Western Australia.

Conservation status
Lasiopetalum laxiflorum is listed as "Priority Three" by the Government of Western Australia Department of Biodiversity, Conservation and Attractions, meaning that it is poorly known and known from only a few locations but is not under imminent threat.

References

laxiflorum
Malvales of Australia
Rosids of Western Australia
Plants described in 1863
Taxa named by George Bentham